Peter Mwita Mokam (born 1960) is a Tanzanian sprinter. He competed in the men's 100 metres at the 1980 Summer Olympics.

References

External links
 

1960 births
Living people
Athletes (track and field) at the 1980 Summer Olympics
Tanzanian male sprinters
Olympic athletes of Tanzania
Athletes (track and field) at the 1978 Commonwealth Games
Commonwealth Games competitors for Tanzania
Place of birth missing (living people)